The Northern Tai languages are an established branch of the Tai languages of Southeast Asia. They include the northern Zhuang languages and Bouyei of China, Tai Mène of Laos and Yoy of Thailand.

Languages

Ethnologue
Ethnologue distinguishes the following languages: 

 Saek (Laos and northeast Thailand; listed outside Tai proper in the Ethnologue classification, though said to be similar to Tai Maen, which is listed as Northern Tai)
 Tai Maen (Laos)
 Yoy (Thailand) [?]
 Bouyei (Buyi) (China) (including the language of the Giáy people of Vietnam)
 Central Hongshuihe Zhuang
 Eastern Hongshuihe Zhuang
 Guibei Zhuang
 Yei Zhuang
 Lianshan Zhuang
 Liujiang Zhuang
 Liuqian Zhuang
 Yongbei Zhuang
 Youjiang Zhuang
(See varieties of Zhuang.)

Yoy is elsewhere classified as Southwestern Tai, and E, which is a mixed language Northern Tai-Chinese language.

Longsang Zhuang, a recently described Northern Tai language, is spoken Longsang Township, Debao County, Guangxi, China. Hezhang Buyi is a moribund Northern Tai language of northwestern Guizhou that is notable for having a Kra substratum.

Pittayaporn (2009)
Pittayaporn (2009:300) distinguishes a similar group of Zhuang varieties as group "N", defined by the phonological shifts *ɯj, *ɯw → *aj, *aw. He moves the prestige dialect of Zhuang, the Wuming dialect, from the Northern Tai Yongbei Zhuang to Yongnan Zhuang – purportedly Central Tai – as it lacks these shifts. The various languages and localities Pittayaporn includes in group N, along with their Ethnologue equivalents, are:

Saek
Bouyei 布依 (including the language of the Giáy people of Vietnam)
Yei Zhuang 剥隘
(Wenshan Zhuang and Miao Autonomous Prefecture, Yunnan)
Guangnan Sha 广南沙族 = Guibian Zhuang (north Guangnan; south Guangnan is Nong Zhuang)
Qiubei 丘北县 = Qiubei Zhuang
(Baise, Guangxi)
Lingyun 凌乐/凌云县 = Guibian Zhuang
Pingguo 平果县 = Yongbei Zhuang
Tiandong 田东县 = Youjiang Zhuang
Tianlin 田林县 = Guibian Zhuang
(Nanning Prefecture, Guangxi)
Hengxian 横县 = Yongbei Zhuang
Shanglin 上林县 = Hongshuihe Zhuang
Yongbei 邕北 = Yongbei Zhuang
(Guigang Prefecture, Guangxi)
Guigang 贵港 City = Hongshuihe Zhuang ?
Dulan 独兰 Village, Pingnan 平南县
Laibin 来宾 Prefecture, Guangxi = Hongshuihe Zhuang (south Laibin), Liujiang Zhuang (north Laibin)
(Hechi Prefecture, Guangxi)
Hechi City 河池 = Guibei Zhuang
Huanjiang 环江 = Guibei Zhuang
Nandan 南丹县 = Guibei Zhuang
Yishan 宜州 = Liujiang Zhuang
(Liuzhou Prefecture, Guangxi)
Liujiang 柳江县 = Liujiang Zhuang
Rong'an 融安县 = Guibei Zhuang
Longsheng 龙胜县, Guilin 桂林, Guangxi = Guibei Zhuang
Dong'an 东安县, Yongzhou 永州, Hunan
Lianshan 连山县, Qingyuan 清远, Guangdong = Lianshan Zhuang

Vocabulary
Some examples of lexical and phonological differences between Northern Tai and Central-Southwestern Tai:

References

Languages of Southeast Asia
Tai languages